Southern Monmouthshire was a parliamentary constituency in Monmouthshire.  It returned one Member of Parliament (MP) to the House of Commons of the Parliament of the United Kingdom.

History

The constituency was created by the Redistribution of Seats Act 1885 for the 1885 general election, which divided into three constituencies,  the Monmouthshire constituency that had elected two members until 1885. The constituency was abolished for the 1918 general election, when most of its area became the Monmouth county constituency.

In 1852, the old constituency had elected members of two powerful families - the Morgans of Tredegar and the Somerset dukes of Beaufort.  In 1885, the Morgan interest continued with the election of Colonel Hon. Frederick Courtenay Morgan as MP from 1885 until 1906 when he retired. His son, Courtney Morgan, afterwards Baron Tredegar attempted to succeed him, but was defeated by another local landowner Colonel Ivor Herbert of Llanarth, Monmouthshire. Herbert retained the constituency until 1917 when he departed to the House of Lords. The constituency was abolished a year later.

Boundaries 

The constituency consisted of:
The petty sessional divisions of:
Caerleon (the civil parishes of Caerleon, Kilgwrrwg, Llandegveth, Llangattock, Llanhennock, Llanthewy-vach, Llanvihangel, Llantarnam, Llanfrechfa Lower and Tredunnock)
Chepstow (Caerwent, Caldicot, Chapel Hill, Chepstow, Howick, Ifton, Itton, Llanfihnagel juxta Rogiet, Llnavair Discoed, Mathern, Mounton, Newchurch, Penterry, Portskewett, Rogiet, St Arvans, Shirenewton, Tintern Parva)
Christchurch (Bishton, Christchurch (part), Goldcliff, Kemeys Inferior, Llangstone, Llanmartin, Llanvaches, Magor, Nash, Penhow, Redwick, St Brides Netherwent, Undy, Whitson and Wilcrick)
Monmouth (Dixton (part), Mitchel Troy, Monmouth (part), Rockfield and Wonastow)
Newport (Bassaleg, Bettws, Coedkernew, Duffryn, Graig, Henllys, Llandavenny, Machen, Malpas, Marshfield, Michaelstone-y-vedw, Peterstone, Risca, Rogerstone, Rumney, St Bride's Wentloog, St Mellons and St Woollos (part))
Raglan (Bryngwyn, Clytha, Dingestow, Llanarth, Llandenny, Parc Grace Dieu, Penrhos, Pen-y-clawdd, Raglan and Tregare)
Trellech (Cwmcarvan, Llandogo, Llanishen, Llangoven, Llanfihangel Tor-y-Mynydd, Penallt, Trelleck and Wolvesnewton)
and Usk (Bettws Newydd, Gwehellog, Gwernesney, Kemeys Commander, Llanbadoc, Llangeview, Llangibby, LIangwm-Isaf, Llangwm-Ucha, Llanllowell, Llansoy, LIantrissant, Monkswood, Trostrey and Usk)
The parts of the municipal boroughs of
Monmouth
and Newport outside the Monmouth Boroughs constituency
The civil parishes of
Bedwas
and Mynyddislwyn.

Members of Parliament

Elections

Elections in the 1880s

Elections in the 1890s

Elections in the 1900s

Elections in the 1910s

General Election 1914–15:

Another General Election was required to take place before the end of 1915. The political parties had been making preparations for an election to take place and by July 1914, the following candidates had been selected; 
Liberal: Ivor Herbert
Unionist: 
Labour:

References 

History of Monmouthshire
Historic parliamentary constituencies in South Wales
Constituencies of the Parliament of the United Kingdom established in 1885
Constituencies of the Parliament of the United Kingdom disestablished in 1918
Politics of Monmouthshire